This is an incomplete list of earthquakes in Alaska.

See also
Geology of Alaska

References

Earthquakes
 
Alaska